Quebrada del Rosario is a corregimiento in Las Minas District, Herrera Province, Panama with a population of 794 as of 2010. Its population as of 1990 was 2,090; its population as of 2000 was 1,847.

References

Corregimientos of Herrera Province